The shrike-like tanager (Neothraupis fasciata), also known as the white-banded tanager, is a South American bird in the tanager family Thraupidae. It is the only member of the genus Neothraupis.

Taxonomy
The shrike-like tanager was formally described in 1823 by the German naturalist Hinrich Lichtenstein under the binomial name Tanagra fasciata. The species is now the only member of the genus Neothraupis that was introduced in 1936 by the Austrian ornithologist Carl Eduard Hellmayr. The genus name combines the Ancient Greek neos meaning "new" and thraupis, the word for an unknown small bird, perhaps some form of finch. The specific epithet is from the Late Latin fasciatus  meaning "banded". The shrike-like tanager is monotypic: no subspecies are recognised.

Description
The plumage of the shrike-like tanager is remarkably similar to that of several species of shrikes in the genus Lanius, but these Corvoidea are quite distantly related songbirds. Males and females of this species look alike.

Distribution and habitat
It is restricted to Cerrado, woodland and shrub of central-eastern Brazil, north-eastern Paraguay and north-eastern Bolivia. It is frequently seen in Chapada dos Guimarães, Mato Grosso, Brazil.

Behaviour
Typically seen in pairs or small groups of up to 12 individuals, with 7 being average. Eats insects. Breeds in October and November. The deep, cup-shaped nest, typically placed in a small tree or bush, is lined with grasses. Clutch size 2–3 eggs. The pair are often helped by birds from earlier broods, which have the grey parts of the plumage partially or entirely replaced by brown (this brownish plumage sometimes mistakenly referred to as the adult female plumage).

References

External links
 Xeno-canto: audio recordings of the shrike-like tanager
 

shrike-like tanager
Birds of Bolivia
Birds of the Cerrado
Birds of Paraguay
shrike-like tanager
Tanagers